The 1999 Tennessee Volunteers football team represented the University of Tennessee in the 1999 NCAA Division I-A football season.  The Volunteers offense scored 369 points while the defense allowed 194 points. Phillip Fulmer was the head coach and led the team to an appearance in the Fiesta Bowl.

Schedule

Personnel

Rankings

Team players drafted into the NFL

References

Tennessee
Tennessee Volunteers football seasons
Tennessee Volunteers football